Romualdas Granauskas (18 May 1939 – 28 October 2014) was a Lithuanian/Samogitian author and dramaturge. He was born in Mažeikiai, Lithuania.

Biography
After finishing youth labour school in Seda, he worked with the Lithuanian newspaper "Mūsų žodis" and the  magazine "Nemunas", established in Skuodas, as an editor. Later on he worked as construction worker, metalworker, radio reporter, and lectured in Mosėdis.

Granauskas started publishing his stories in 1954 in his collection "Medžių viršūnės" (eng. "Tops of the Trees") (1969), and in "Duonos valgytojai" (eng. "Bread Eaters") (1975), where he spoke about the elder generation of retiring farmers, also about their customs, daily life, moral code. One of the main creations of Romualdas Granauskas is considered to be the novella "Gyvenimas po klevu" (eng. "Life Under the Maple Tree") (1988), which drew the whole society's attention. Nature, history and mythology are the topics of one of the most mature and sophisticated novellas of R.Granauskas "Jaučio aukojimas" (eng. "Sacrifice of a Bull") (1975).

Duburys (Vortex) is a classical artistic novel covering the entire life of the main character during Soviet times in Lithuania (2003). He died in Vilnius on 28 October 2014, aged 75.

References

  Romualdas Granauskas. Lithuanian Writer's Union. Accessed 2010-11-27.
  Pernai bibliotekose skaitomiausia lietuviška knyga buvo R.Granausko „Gyvenimas po klevu“ (Translation: Last year, "Gyvenimas po klevu" was one of the most widely read books in Lithuanian libraries. Lietuvos rytas, September 16, 2010. Accessed 2010-11-27.

External links

Lithuanian writers
1939 births
2014 deaths
Burials at Antakalnis Cemetery
People from Mažeikiai
Recipients of the Lithuanian National Prize
Dramaturges
20th-century dramatists and playwrights